Krokom Municipality is a municipality in Jämtland County in northern Sweden. Its seat is located in Krokom.

The present municipality was formed in 1974, when the former municipalities of Alsen, Föllinge, Offerdal and Rödön were amalgamated. The number of original local government entities in the area is nine, and amalgamations had also taken place in 1952 and 1969.

Localities
There are eleven localities (or urban areas) in Krokom Municipality:

The municipal seat is shown in bold

Villages
Flykälen
Kaxås
Rönnöfors

Sports
The following sports clubs are located in Krokom Municipality:

 Alsens IF
 Ås IF

References

External links

Krokom Municipality - Official site 

Municipalities of Jämtland County